The Norma M2000 is a sports prototype race car, designed, developed, and produced by French constructor Norma, for competition in sports car racing, between 2000 and 2003.

References

Sports prototypes
M2000